Launch It is the new name for The London Youth Support Trust, which rebranded in 2019. Building on their 19 years’ experience of supporting young people from disadvantaged backgrounds to start successful and sustainable businesses, they have expanded their services across the UK.

The London Youth Support Trust is a youth enterprise charity in the United Kingdom founded in 2000 to help young people from disadvantaged backgrounds.  Through their business incubation centres, they provide young people aged 18–30 with guidance and space at a subsidised rent to develop their business.

They have centres in Tottenham, Aylesbury, Peckham and a newly launched centre in Mitcham.
The Trust's newest centre, The Mitcham Enterprise Centre, was opened by Siobhain Mcdonagh, the MP of Merton in 2018.

Centres

Tottenham Green Enterprise Centre (TGEC) 
The Tottenham Green Enterprise Centre was set up as a joint venture involving the London Borough of Haringey, the Tottenham Task Force, the College of North East London and North London TEC.  In 2008, the London Youth Support Trust took over the running of the centre, hosting a range of different businesses.

639 Enterprise Centre 
The 639 Enterprise Centre, based in Tottenham, was established with funding from the Mayor of London's Regeneration fund, targeted at improving communities damaged by the 2011 London Riots. The centre was opened by Boris Johnson, Mayor of London in May 2013.

Alongside business space and guidance, the centre also offers help finding work, placements and volunteering opportunities to the local community.
In 2014, the centre became a  CitySafe Haven, dedicated to the life of 17-year-old  Godwin Lawson, a 17-year-old Tottenham resident who died in a knife attack in 2010.

Mitcham Enterprise Centre 
On 25 January 2018 the London Youth Support Trust opened up their newly refurbished enterprise centre in Mitcham. With the help of Moat Homes and United Living, LYST were able to rejuvenate this centre into business planning, to help accessing funding, to mentoring and digital skills training, there is a wide range of services available, all completely free. Opening the centre was Siobhain Mcdonagh, the MP for Merton/Mitcham, who helped a huge part in turning this place into the stature it is today.

Peckham Enterprise Centre 
The Peckham Enterprise centre is LYST's main centre in South London. Opened on 1 April 2016 Peckham has been an innovation for many young entrepreneurs and has proven to be a successful addition to LYST. A partnership between, LYST and Southwark Council, the centre hosts 11 start-up businesses and gives pre-starts a space to work in its hot-desking area. Nestled within the Peckham Enterprise Centre the new Enterprise Garden. The indoor garden contains 7 modified sheds that have been transformed into office spaces.

Dundee Enterprise Centre 
Launch It Dundee opened in May 2019 right in the heart of Dundee City Centre at Kandahar House.  Launch It Dundee is a separate charity (charity number – SCO48425), supported in its set-up by the Launch It Trust.

References 

2000 establishments in the United Kingdom
Organizations established in 2000
Children's charities based in the United Kingdom